Samantha May (born 16 September 1987), also known as Sam May, is a former Australian netball player who played for Hertfordshire Mavericks, Wasps and Loughborough Lightning in the Netball Superleague, featuring in five grand finals in 2015, 2017, 2018, 2019 and 2021, winning three times. In Australia, May played for Sydney Swifts and AIS Canberra Darters in the Commonwealth Bank Trophy and for New South Wales Swifts in the ANZ Championship.

Early life and education 
Between 2017 and 2019 May attended the University of Hertfordshire and gained a BSc in Business and Sports Management. May also played netball for the 
University of Hertfordshire at BUCS intervarsity level.

Playing career

Australia
Sydney Swifts
May made 13 appearances for Sydney Swifts in the Commonwealth Bank Trophy.

AIS Canberra Darters
In 2007 May played for AIS Canberra Darters in the Commonwealth Bank Trophy.

AIS
In 2008 May played for the Australian Institute of Sport in the Australian Netball League.

NSW Swifts
Between 2009 and 2013, May played for NSW Swifts in the ANZ Championship. In March 2009 she made her debut for Swifts in a pre-season tournament. She then made her ANZ Championship debut in Round 1 of the 2009 season in a match against Canterbury Tactix. In 2011 May was a member of the NNSW Waratahs team that won the Australian Netball League title.

National team
Between 2007 and 2008, May represented Australia at under-21 level. She had earlier represented Australia at under-17 level.

Netball Superleague
Hertfordshire Mavericks
Between 2014 and 2016, May played for Hertfordshire Mavericks in the Netball Superleague. In 2015 she played in her first Netball Superleague grand final, but finished on losing team as Mavericks lost 56–39 to Surrey Storm.

Wasps
Between 2017 and 2019, May played for Wasps. May helped Wasps win two successive Netball Superleague titles and played in two further grand finals in 2017 and 2018.

Loughborough Lightning
In 2019 May signed for Loughborough Lightning. She was subsequently a member of the Lightning team that won the 2019 British Fast5 Netball All-Stars Championship. On 22 June 2021, May announced her retirement from elite netball, following in the footsteps of fellow announcers Karyn Bailey and Jo Trip. In her penultimate game with Loughborough Lightning, she was the POM and after winning the grand final with them on Sunday 27 June 2021, she retired.

Coaching career
May has worked as a netball coach at several schools and netball clubs including Highgate School, Haileybury and Loughborough College.

Honours

Loughborough Lightning
Netball Superleague
Winners: 2021
British Fast5 Netball All-Stars Championship
Winners: 2019

Wasps Netball
Netball Superleague
Winners: 2017, 2018

Hertfordshire Mavericks
Netball Superleague
Runners up: 2015

NNSW Waratahs
Australian Netball League
Winners: 2011

References

1987 births
Living people
Australian netball players
Australian netball coaches
Sydney Swifts players
AIS Canberra Darters players
Australian Institute of Sport netball players
ANZ Championship players
New South Wales Swifts players
Australian Netball League players
Netball New South Wales Waratahs players
Netball Superleague players
Loughborough Lightning netball players
Mavericks netball players
Wasps Netball players
Netball players from Sydney
Australian expatriate netball people in England
Alumni of the University of Hertfordshire
New South Wales Institute of Sport netball players
New South Wales state netball league players